Eastmancolor is a trade name used by Eastman Kodak for a number of related film and processing technologies associated with color motion picture production and referring to George Eastman, founder of Kodak.

Eastmancolor, introduced in 1950, was one of the first widely successful "single-strip colour" processes, and eventually displaced the more cumbersome Technicolor. Eastmancolor was known by a variety of names such as DeLuxe Color, Warnercolor, Metrocolor, Pathécolor, Columbiacolor, and others.

For more information on Eastmancolor, see
 Eastman Color Negative (ECN, ECN-1 and ECN-2), the photographic processing systems associated with Eastmancolor negative motion picture stock, and intermediate motion picture stocks (including interpositive and internegative stocks)
 Eastman Color Positive (ECP, ECP-1 and ECP-2), the photographic processing systems associated with Eastmancolor positive print motion picture stock for direct projection
 Color motion picture film, for background on Eastmancolor and other motion picture processes in general
 Eastman Kodak Fine Grain color negative films (1950 onwards), within the "List of motion picture film stocks" article

Examples of films that use Eastmancolor
The 1959 British satirical comedy film The Mouse That Roared was filmed using the Eastmancolor process.

Eastmancolor became very popular in the South Indian film industry during the early 1960s.
 Carson City - (Warnercolor) 1952
 Jigokumon - (Japan) 1953
 The High and the Mighty - (Warnercolor) 1954
 Oklahoma! - 1955
 Rebel Without a Cause (Warnercolor) - 1955
 Foreign Intrigue 1956
 The Bolshoi Ballet - 1957
 Bayanihan - Filipino - 1959
 Peeping Tom - British - 1960
 Kandam Becha Kottu - Malayalam - 1961
The Human Pyramid - France/Ivory Coast 1961
 Mere Mehboob - -Urdu (India) - 1963
 Amara Shilpi Jakkanna - Telugu - 1964
 Kathalikka Neramillai - Tamil - 1964
 Karnan - Tamil 1964
 Padagotti - Tamil - 1964
 Amarashilpi Jakanachari - Kannada - 1964
 The Umbrellas of Cherbourg - French, 1964
 Thene Manasulu - Telugu - 1965
 Chemmeen - Malayalam - 1965
 Thiruvilaiyadal - Tamil - 1965
 Aayirathil Oruvan - Tamil - 1965
 Enga Veetu Pillai - Tamil - 1965
 Idhaya kamalam - Tamil - 1965
 Le Bonheur - French, 1965
 Help! - British, 1965
 Anbe Vaa - Tamil 1966
 Teorema - Italian, 1968
 2001: A Space Odyssey - American/British, 1968 (Color credited as "Metrocolor")
 Macunaíma - Brazilian, 1969
 A Clockwork Orange - British/American, 1971 (Color credited as "Warnercolor")
 Piya Ka Ghar - Hindi, 1971
 To Fly! - United States, 1976 (Eastman Color Negative)
 The NeverEnding Story - German/American, 1984
 Women on the Verge of a Nervous Breakdown - Spanish, 1988
 Jurassic Park - American, 1993
 Lapitch the Little Shoemaker - Croatian, 1997

References

Kodak
Film and video technology
Motion picture film formats
History of film